John Phillips Saylor (July 23, 1908 – October 28, 1973) was a Republican member of the U.S. House of Representatives from Pennsylvania serving from 1949 until his death from a heart attack in Houston, Texas in 1973.

Biography 
Saylor was born in Conemaugh Township, Somerset County, Pennsylvania.  He graduated from Franklin and Marshall College in Lancaster, Pennsylvania, in 1929, and Dickinson School of Law in Carlisle, Pennsylvania in 1933.  He was elected city solicitor of Johnstown, Pennsylvania, in 1938 and served until 1940.  He enlisted in the United States Navy on August 6, 1943 and served until January 1946.

Saylor was elected as a Republican to the 81st Congress, by special election, September 13, 1949, to fill the vacancy caused by the death of Robert L. Coffey. He was reelected to the twelve succeeding Congresses and served until his death in Houston, Texas.  During his time in Congress he became dedicated to a number of environmental causes, including the Wilderness Act of 1964, the Ozark National Scenic Riverways Act, National Wild and Scenic Rivers Act and in opposition to the Kinzua Dam Project.  He was dubbed "St. John" by environmental advocates for his dogged work on environmental issues.

In 1970 the Izaak Walton League of America bestowed its highest honor, the Founders' Award, to Saylor "for two decades of unprecedented leadership in the Congress of the United States for sound resource management, the preservation of natural scenic and cultural values, the maintenance of a quality environment, and the unalienable right of citizens to be involved in resources and environmental decisions."

Saylor voted in favor of the Civil Rights Acts of 1957, 1960, 1964, and 1968, as well as the 24th Amendment to the U.S. Constitution and the Voting Rights Act of 1965.

Saylor died of a heart attack at age 65, and is buried in Grandview Cemetery, Johnstown, Pennsylvania. The John P. Saylor Trail in Gallitzin State Forest is named after him.

See also
 List of United States Congress members who died in office (1950–99)

Sources
 
 
 Voice of Wild and Scenic Rivers: John P. Saylor of Pennsylvania  (full text here)

Notes

American conservationists
Franklin & Marshall College alumni
Politicians from Johnstown, Pennsylvania
People from Somerset County, Pennsylvania
United States Navy officers
1908 births
1973 deaths
Republican Party members of the United States House of Representatives from Pennsylvania
20th-century American politicians
Sierra Club awardees
Military personnel from Pennsylvania